The 2019–20 Nemzeti Bajnokság I/A was the 89th season of the Nemzeti Bajnokság I/A, the highest professional basketball league in Hungary. Falco Vulcano is the defending champion.

On 17 March 2020, the competition was prematurely finished due to the coronavirus pandemic. No champion was named.

Teams 

The following 14 clubs compete in the NB I/A during the 2019–20 season. OSE Lions are promoted to this season as champions from the Hungarian 2018–19 NB I/B. TF Budapest was relegated.

Arenas and locations

Regular season

League table

Results

Hungarian clubs in European competitions

References

Nemzeti Bajnoksag I/A (men's basketball) seasons
Hungarian
Nemzeti Bajnoksag Men